The  Ministry of Cultural Affairs (Sanskr̥ti biṣaẏaka mantraṇālaẏa)  is a ministry of the Government of People's Republic of Bangladesh, in charge of national museums and monuments; promoting and protecting the arts (visual, plastic, theatrical, musical, dance, architectural, literary, televisual and cinematographic) in  Bangladesh and managing the national archives. The Ministry of Cultural Affairs is also charged with maintaining the Bengali identity.

Directorates
Directorate of Archives and Libraries
Department of Public Libraries
Bangladesh Shilpakala Academy
Bangladesh National Museum
Bangla Academy
Department of Archaeology (Bangladesh)
Nazrul Institute
National Book Centre
Bangladesh Copyright Office
Bangladesh Folk Arts and Crafts Foundation

History 
The importance of preserving and spreading culture was recognised so following Bangladesh's independence in 1971 a separate division was created within the Ministry of Education called Cultural Affairs and Sports Division on 26 May 1972. From then the new Division devoted itself to the promotion of the cultural sector of the country. Later in 1975, the Division was adjoined with Labour and Welfare Ministry. However, in the same year it was returned to the Ministry of Education. Subsequently, in 1978 it separated from the Ministry of Education and became known as the Ministry of Cultural Affairs and Sports. Then again in 1979 it was renamed the Ministry of Religious Affairs, Culture and Sports. Then, in 1980 these three sectors were divided into two different ministries: the Ministry of Religious Affairs and the Ministry of Sports & Cultural Affairs.

In 1982, under Hussain Muhammad Ershad's policy of administrative rearrangement, the ministry was converted to Sports & Culture Division and placed under the secretariat of Chief Martial Law Administrator. Next in 1983 it was transferred to President's secretariat. Afterwards in 1984 the Sport & Culture Division was transferred from President's secretariat to the Ministry of Education. In the same year sports related works were separated from Sports & Culture Division and separately made a ministry and named as Ministry of Youth & Sports. And under the Ministry of Education a separate division was made named as Cultural Affairs Division.

Under the Second Khaleda Cabinet starting in 2001, the Ministry operated under the name of Ministry of Cultural Affairs under State Minister Selima Rahman. Then in the subsequent Second Sheikh Hasina Cabinet starting in 2008, the Ministry of Cultural Affairs was run under Minister Abul Kalam Azad who was simultaneously Minister for Ministry of Information. Since the Third Sheikh Hasina Cabinet, formed in 2014, the Ministry has been operating as full-fledged Ministry, under Mr. Asaduzzaman Noor, with Md. Nasir Uddin Ahmed as the Secretary of the Ministry.

Former ministers

References

Cultural Affairs
Bangladeshi culture
Culture ministries
Ministry of Cultural Affairs (Bangladesh)
1972 establishments in Bangladesh